Hastings & St Leonards United was a professional football club based in Hastings, East Sussex. The club spent four seasons playing in the Southern League, whilst also competing in the South Eastern League and United League.

History
Hastings & St Leonards United was formed in 1906 by the merger of Hastings & St Leonards FC and St Leonards United. Both clubs had been struggling financially after failing to attract sufficient crowds and after a meeting between the two board of directors, it was decided that it was in the best interests of local football to merge the two rival clubs.

Hastings & St Leonards
Hastings & St Leonards FC was formed in 1890 as Hastings Athletic, they were part of the Hastings & St Leonards Amateur Athletic Club who were based on the Central Recreation Ground and the club colours were red and blue. In 1895 the club changed their name to Hastings & St Leonards (often shortened to Hastings FC)  and in 1896 became founder members of the East Sussex League, winning the competition four times. In 1904 they entered the South Eastern League, which was founded as a league for reserve teams for the professional clubs playing, however Hastings joined the teams such as Hitchin and Eastbourne who were also amateur sides competing in a professional league.

St Leonards United
St Leonards United was founded as St Leonards FC in 1898  and were nicknamed the 'Greenbacks' due to the club colours of green and white. The club used a green and white version of the St Leonards coat of arms designed by James Burton. For their first season they played home games at The Green in St Leonards, before switching to Silverhill. They entered the East Sussex League in 1899, winning the competition in 1903, before turning professional and entering the Southern and South Eastern Leagues in 1905. Their move into professional football meant a change of name to St Leonards United and a move to the purpose built 'Sports Ground', sharing with Rock-a-Nore.

Two clubs merge
After the merger, the club had full use of the facilities at the 'Sports Ground', following Rock-a-Nores move back to the East Hill in Hastings Old Town. The club colours were now red and green, a combination of the previous club colours and old places in the Southern and South Eastern Leagues were taken up by the new club. The club were to spend four seasons trying to achieve promotion from Division Two of the Southern League and in the 1909–10 season they won Division Two B, but lost in a play-off tie against Stoke and were denied promotion once more. By now the club had mounting debts and were still struggling for attendances needed to sustain professional football and the club was wound up at the end of the 1909–10 season.

Seasons

Players
For all Hastings & St Leonards United players with a Wikipedia article see :Category:Hastings & St Leonards United F.C. players.

Ground
The Sports Ground, located in what is now White Rock Gardens, was the club's home pitch for the 1906-07 season. However, for the following seasons they played mostly at Central Recreation Ground, using the Sports Ground when their main pitch was unavailable. The Central Ground, as it was often shortened to, was used by the Hastings club before the merger whilst pitches at the Green, Silverhill and the Sports Ground were used by St Leonards.

Honours
Southern League
Southern League Division 2 Runners Up (1) 1908–09
Southern League Division 2B Winners (1) 1909–10

Records
Record attendance: 4,000 vs Portsmouth, FA Cup 1st Round, 11 January 1908.
Transfer fee received: £250 from Arsenal for Bert Beney, February 1909.
Biggest win: 10-0 vs Croydon Common, South Eastern League, 11 September 1907.
Biggest defeat: 0-6 vs Stoke, Southern League Division Two Play-off, 25 April 1910.
Most goals in a season: Bert Beney, 60 (1907–08)

References

External links

Hastings & St Leonards United Hastings Football History

Sport in Hastings
Defunct football clubs in East Sussex
Defunct football clubs in England
Association football clubs established in 1906
Association football clubs disestablished in 1910
Southern Football League clubs
East Sussex Football League
1906 establishments in England